Loudspeakers (stylised as LOUDspeakers) is a Georgian rock band formed in 2009.

History

Loudspeakers formed in 2009 as an alternative rock band. In that year, the band recorded their first song in the kote kalandadze studio.  In January 2010 they played their songs in Tbilisi rock club. In 2010 otar gurgenidze left the band, Zura Mchedlishvili replaced him. The same time Zura left and Dato Tsomaia joined the band.

The first important success of this band was when they played in Tbilisi Altervision-Newcomers and became a winner.
In 2011 the band had the first solo concert in Magti Club. After this concert Aleko Dolidze left the band. It was an important loss but LoudSpeakers didn’t stop their work, Sandro Tsiklauri joined the band.

By today LoudSpeakers have played in festivals in Georgia and other countries around the world. For example, Tbilisi Open Air and Arenal Sound Festival.

The band realised their debut album Lighthouse on 4 March 2015.

Band members
Current members 

 Levan Loudadze – Lead Vocals and guitars (2009–present)
 Levan Mamaladze – Bass Guitar (2009–present)
 Sandro Tsiklauri – Keyboards (2011–present)
 Giorgi Tetso – Drums (2018–present)

Former members
  Aleko Dolidze – Keyboards (2009–2011)
 otar gurgenidze – Drums (2009–2010)
 Zura Mchedlishvili - Drums (2010)
 Dato Tsomaia - Drums (2010-2017)

Discography
Albums
 Lighthouse (2015)

Singles
 In This World (2009)
 World In My Eyes (2010)
 Fallen In You (2011)
 Old Dreamer (2012)
 Lighthouse (2014)
 Between Two Ways (2018)

References

External links
 Loudspeakers in Myspase
 Loudspeakers in Facebook
 Loudspeakers in lastfm

Rock music groups from Georgia (country)
Musical groups established in 2009
Alternative rock groups from Georgia (country)